The 2016 Puerto Rican municipal election was held on November 8, 2016, to elect the mayors of the 78 municipalities of Puerto Rico, concurrently with the election of the Governor, the Resident Commissioner, the Senate, and the House of Representatives. The winners were be elected to a four-year term from January 3, 2016, to January 3, 2020.

The Popular Democratic Party kept most of the municipalities, only going from 47 to 45. 8 municipalities flipped parties, these being Aguada, Aguas Buenas, Cataño, Ciales, Las Marías, Loiza, Morovis, Vega Alta. The most shocking flip was Loiza, which had been under New Progressive Party control since 1973.

Results

Adjuntas 

Incumbent mayor Jaime Barlucea Maldonado won his fourth term.

Aguada 

Manuel Santiago Mendoza won the PNP primary and won against incumbent mayor Jessie Cortés Ramos.

Aguadilla 

Incumbent mayor Carlos Méndez Martínez won the PNP primary and his sixth term.

Aguas Buenas 

Previous PPD mayor Luis Arroyo Chiqués announced on May 18, 2015, that he would not seek re-election for a 4th term. PNP candidate Javier García Pérez won the election, ending 12 years of PPD control of the municipality.

Aibonito 

Incumbent mayor William Alicea Pérez won his third term.

Añasco 

Pablo Crespo Torres won the PNP primary. Nonetheless, incumbent mayor Jorge Estévez Martínez won his third term.

Arecibo 

Incumbent mayor Carlos Molina Rodríguez won the PNP primary and his second term.

Arroyo 

Edwin Santell Cora won the PNP primary. Nonetheless, incumbent mayor Eric Bachier Román won his second term.

Barceloneta 

Incumbent mayor Wanda Soler Rosario won her second term.

Barranquitas 

Incumbent mayor Francisco López López won his sixth term.

Bayamón 

Incumbent mayor Ramón Rivera Cruz won his fifth term.

Cabo Rojo 

Jorge Morales Wiscovitch won the PNP primary. Nonetheless, incumbent mayor Roberto Ramírez Kurtz won his second term.

Caguas 

Roberto López won the PNP primary. Nonetheless, incumbent mayor William Miranda Torres won his second term.

Camuy 

Iván Serrano Cordero won the PPD primary. Nonetheless, incumbent mayor Edwin García Feliciano won his fourth term.

Canóvanas 

Previous PNP mayor José Soto Rivera announced on May 14, 2014, that he would renounce to his post on June 30, 2014, and that his daughter, Lorna Soto Villanueva would take over as mayor. On July 1, Soto Villanueva was sworn in as the mayor to finish her father's term. She went on to win the PNP primary and was elected to serve a first full term in office.

Carolina 

Eduardo González Antelo won the PNP primary. Nonetheless, incumbent mayor José Aponte Dalmau won his third term.

Cataño 

On May 16, 2016, The PPD cancelled the primary, because the collectivity discovered that candidate Leslie Eaton Ramos had been previously booked by the police for an alleged criminal event. Eaton Ramos took the party to court, where it was decided that the primary had to be held, where the incumbent mayor José Rosario Meléndez won, with a total of 4 votes. The PPD appealed, and the Court of Appeals declared that Eaton Ramos was officially disqualified, and that incumbent mayor Rosario Meléndez had to be declared the winner. The Supreme Court of Puerto Rico decided not to revise the Court of Appeals' decision. Incumbent mayor José Rosario Meléndez ultimately lost to PNP candidate Félix Delgado Montalvo.

Cayey 

Von Rivera Rivera won the PNP primary. Nonetheless, incumbent mayor Rolando Ortiz Velázquez won his sixth term.

Ceiba 

Melinda Ramos won the PPD primary. Nonetheless, incumbent mayor Angelo Cruz Ramos won the PNP primary and his second term.

Ciales 

Incumbent mayor Juan Rodríguez Pérez ran for a second term, but lost to PNP candidate Luis Maldonado Rodríguez, who won his third non-consecutive term.

Cidra 

Incumbent mayor Javier Carrasquillo Cruz won his second term.

Coamo 

Incumbent mayor Juan García Padilla won his fifth term.

Comerío 

Incumbent mayor José Santiago Rivera won his fifith term.

Corozal 

Incumbent mayor Sergio Torres Torres won his second term.

Culebra 

Basilio Graciani Pereira won the PNP primary. Nonetheless, incumbent mayor Iván Solís Bermúdez won the PPD primary and his second term.

Dorado 

Waldemar Volmar Méndez won the PNP primary. Nonetheless, incumbent mayor Carlos López Rivera won his eighth term.

Fajardo 

Incumbent mayor Aníbal Meléndez Rivera won his eight term.

Florida 

Incumbent mayor José Gerena Polanco won the PNP primary and his second term.

Guánica 

Incumbent mayor Santos Seda Nazario won his second term.

Guayama 

Incumbent mayor Eduardo Cintrón Suárez won the PPD primary and his second term.

Guayanilla 

Previous PPD mayor Edgardo Arlequín Vélez was suspended by his party on May 6, 2015, because he was accused of sexual harassment by an employee. It wasn't until January 13, 2016, until he resigned from his post. 28th district representative Nelson Torres Yordán resigned from his post in the House of Representatives to become mayor. While Héctor Rodríguez Rodríguez won the PNP primary, Torres Yordán ultimately was elected to serve a first full term in office.

Guaynabo 

Incumbent mayor Hector O'Neill Garcia won the PNP primary and his sixth term.

Gurabo 

Incumbent mayor Víctor Ortiz Díaz won the PNP primary and his fourth term.

Hatillo 

Incumbent mayor José Rodríguez Cruz won his fourth term.

Hormigueros 

Incumbent mayor Pedro García Figueroa won his fourth term.

Humacao 

Reinaldo Vargas Rodríguez won the PNP primary. Nonetheless, incumbent mayor Marcelo Trujillo Panisse won the PPD primary and his fifth term.

Isabela 

Juvencio Méndez Mercado won the PPD primary. Nonetheless, incumbent PPD mayor Carlos Delgado Altieri won his fifth term.

Jayuya 

Incumbent mayor Jorge González Otero won his sixth term.

Juana Díaz 

Incumbent mayor Ramón Hernández Torres won his fifth term.

Juncos 

Incumbent mayor Alfredo Alejandro Carrión won his fifth term.

Lajas 

Incumbent mayor Marcos Irizarry Pagán won his second term.

Lares 

Incumbent mayor Roberto Pagán Centeno won the PNP primary and his fourth term.

Las Marías 

Incumbent mayor José Javier Rodríguez ran for a second term, but lost to PNP candidate Edwin Soto Santiago, who won his fifth non-consecutive term.

Las Piedras 

Incumbent mayor Miguel López Rivera won his third term.

Loíza 

Incumbent mayor Eddie Manso Fuentes ran for a fourth term, won the PNP primary, but lost to PPD candidate Julia Nazario Fuentes, ending 44 years of PNP control of the municipality.

Luquillo 

Carlos Rodríguez Rivera won the PNP primary. Nonetheless, incumbent mayor Jesús Márquez Rodríguez won his third term.

Manatí 

Incumbent mayor Juan Cruz Manzano announced that he would not seek re-election, opting to retire after 40 years of being mayor. José Sánchez González won the PNP primary and the election.

Maricao 

Wilfredo Ruiz Feliciano won the PPD primary. Nonetheless, incumbent mayor Gilberto Pérez Valentín won the PNP primary and his sixth term.

Maunabo 

Incumbent mayor Jorge Márquez Pérez won his fifth term.

Mayagüez 

Tania Lugo López won the PNP primary. Nonetheless, incumbent mayor José Rodríguez Rodríguez won his seventh term.

Moca 

Incumbent mayor José Avilés Santiago won the PNP primary and his fifth term.

Morovis 

Incumbent mayor Heriberto Rodríguez Adorno announced via Twitter that he would not seek re-election, opting to retire after 12 years of being mayor. 12th district representative Héctor Torres Calderón opted not to run for the House of Representatives to instead run for mayor, winning the PNP primary. Torres Calderón went on to lose to PPD candidate Carmen Maldonado González, ending 12 years of PNP control in the municipality.

Naguabo 

Incumbent mayor Noé Marcano Riveri won his second term.

Naranjito 

Incumbent mayor Orlando Ortiz Chevres won his third term.

Orocovis 

Incumbent mayor Jesús Colón Berlingeri won his sixth term.

Patillas 

Maritza Sánchez Neris won the PNP primary. Nonetheless, incumbent mayor Norberto Soto Figueroa won his second term.

Peñuelas 

Incumbent mayor Walter Torres Maldonado won his sixth term.

Ponce 

Incumbent mayor María Meléndez Altieri won the PNP primary and her third term. The Ponceños' Autonomous Movement, a local autonomous party that had candidates for 2008 and 2012, allied itself with the Working People's Party to nominate the candidate instead.

Quebradillas 

Jeron Muñiz Lasalle won the PNP primary. Nonetheless, incumbent mayor Heriberto Vélez Vélez won his fourth term.

Rincón 

Incumbent mayor Carlos López Bonilla won the PPD primary and his fifth term.

Río Grande 

Previous PPD mayor Eduard Rivera Correa was arrested by the FBI on July 10, 2014, for participating in a bribery scheme where he would receive money in exchange for contracting certain companies and suppliers. He resigned his post on September 2, 2014, and later on September 24, the CEE certified Ángel González Damudt as the new mayor of Río Grande. David Acosta Rodríguez won the PNP primary, but incumbent mayor González Damudt went on to win his first-full term.

Sabana Grande 

Incumbent mayor Miguel Ortiz Vélez won his fifth term.

Salinas 

Rafael Picó Seda won the PNP primary. Nonetheless, Karilyn Bonilla Colón won her second term.

San Germán 

Incumbent mayor Isidro Negrón Irizarry ran for a 6th term, won the PPD primary, but lost to Virgilio Olivera Olivera, ending 20 years of PPD control of the municipality.

San Juan 

Leo Díaz Urbina won the PNP primary. Nonetheless, incumbent mayor Carmen Cruz Soto won her second term.

San Lorenzo 

Omar Galarza Pagán won the PNP primary. Nonetheless, incumbent mayor José Román Abreu won his fifth term.

San Sebastián 

Incumbent mayor Javier Jiménez Pérez won his fourth term.

Santa Isabel 

Marcos Martínez won the PPD primary. Nonetheless, incumbent mayor Enrique Questell Alvarado won the PNP primary and his fourth term.

Toa Alta 

Incumbent mayor Clemente Agosto Lugardo won his second term.

Toa Baja 

Incumbent mayor Aníbal Vega Borges lost the PNP primary to Bernardo Márquez García. Márquez García went on to win the election.

Trujillo Alto 

Emmanuel Huertas won the PNP primary. Nonetheless, incumbent mayor José Cruz Cruz won his third term.

Utuado 

Jonathan Tossas won the PNP primary. Nonetheless, incumbent mayor Ernesto Irizarry Salvá won his second term.

Vega Alta 

Incumbent mayor Isabelo Molina Hernandez ran for a fourth consecutive term (and sixth non-consecutive term), won the PNP primary, but lost to PPD primary winner Oscar Santiago Martínez, ending 12 years of PNP control of the municipality.

Vega Baja 

José Galán Rojas won the PNP primary. Nonetheless, incumbent mayor Marcos Cruz Molina won his second term.

Vieques 

Evelyn Delerme Camacho won the PNP primary. Nonetheless, incumbent mayor Víctor Emeric Catarineau won his second term.

Villalba 

Previous PPD mayor Waldemar Rivera Torres renounced to his post on January 13, 2013, before taking his oath for hid third term. Luis Hernández Ortiz was sworn in the very next day. While Melvin Vázquez Roche won the PNP primary, incumbent mayor Hernández Ortiz won his first full term in office.

Yabucoa 

Incumbent mayor Rafael Surillo Ruiz won the PPD primary and his second term.

Yauco 

Incumbent mayor Abel Nazario Quiñones decided not to run for a fifth term, choosing instead to run at-large for the Senate of Puerto Rico. Ángel Torres Ortiz won the PNP primary and the election.

References 

General elections in Puerto Rico
2016 in Puerto Rico
Puerto Rico
November 2016 events in the United States
2016 Puerto Rico elections
2016 United States mayoral elections